Cortsen is a Danish surname. Notable people with the surname include:

Kenneth Cortsen (born 1976), Danish sport management researcher 
Leo Cortsen (born 1930), Danish wrestler

Danish-language surnames